The 33rd Guangdong-Hong Kong Cup was held in 1 and 4 January 2011. The first leg was played at Guangdong People's Stadium, Guangzhou on 1 January, with the second leg taken place at Hong Kong Stadium, Hong Kong on 4 January.

Squads

Guangdong
The squad was announced on 30 December 2010.
Manager:  Cao Yang

|-----
! colspan="9" bgcolor="#B0D3FB" align="left" |
|----- bgcolor="#DFEDFD"

|-----
! colspan="9" bgcolor="#B0D3FB" align="left" |
|----- bgcolor="#DFEDFD"

|-----
! colspan="9" bgcolor="#B0D3FB" align="left" |
|----- bgcolor="#DFEDFD"

Hong Kong
The squad was selected by Tsang Wai Chung and was announced on 23 December 2010.

Honorary Manager:  Li Chu Kwan
Manager:  Brian Leung,  Pui Kwan Kay,  Steven Lo
Head coach:  Tsang Wai Chung
Assistant coach:  Szeto Man Chun,  Chan Chi Hong
Goalkeeping coach:  Fan Chun Yip
Physio:  Yau Kai Ching

Match details

First leg

Second leg

References

2010–11 in Hong Kong football
2011
2011 in Chinese football